Prosperity is an unincorporated community in Morris Township, Washington County, Pennsylvania, United States.

According to tradition, the name "Prosperity" stems from the first settlers' optimism.

References

Unincorporated communities in Washington County, Pennsylvania
Unincorporated communities in Pennsylvania